HUGE Improv Theater is a Minneapolis theater founded in 2005 dedicated to long form improvisational theater. It was formalized as a non-profit in 2009, and began a lease on a theater space in 2010, where it runs scheduled nightly improv performances and hosts several annual improv festivals. HUGE announced plans to move into a new space following a controversy over its landlord's support of David Duke's 2016 campaign for a U.S. Senate seat in Louisiana.

History

In 2009, HUGE was founded as a non-profit arts organization dedicated to long form improvisational theater, the only of its kind in Minneapolis. Butch Roy, Nels Lennes, Jill Bernard, and later Molly Chase, were responsible for the theater's creation.

In August 2017, a story in City Pages reported that HUGE's landlord, Julius Jaeger De Roma, had donated $500 to former Ku Klux Klan leader David Duke's 2016 campaign for a U.S. Senate seat in Louisiana. Upon this revelation, HUGE's board of directors denounced De Roma and began conversations about moving the theater to a new space. In May 2019, HUGE announced a capital campaign to fund the eventual purchase of its own facility.

As of 2019, HUGE was producing around 600 shows per year with an annual operating budget of $540,000.

Shows and classes

HUGE runs improv shows six nights per week. The theater also hosts classes for beginning improv students and workshops for more advanced improvisers. HUGE is the site of the annual Twin Cities Improv Festival, a creation of the theater's staff designed to increase the presence of improvised theater in the Twin Cities.  It also hosts independent improv festivals such as the Black & Funny Improv Festival and Queer & Funny Improv Festival.

References

External links
 HUGE show schedule
 Video by MplsTV on HUGE's opening

Buildings and structures in Minneapolis
Improvisational theatre
Tourist attractions in Minneapolis
Non-profit organizations based in Minnesota
Arts organizations based in Minneapolis
Theatre in Minneapolis
Arts organizations established in 2005
2005 establishments in Minnesota